The 2011–12 season of the División de Plata de Balonmano was the 18th season of second-tier handball in Spain.

Promotion and relegation 
Once finished 2011–12 regular season.

Teams promoted to Liga ASOBAL 2012–13
ARS PalmaNaranja – 1st at standings
Frigoríficos del Morrazo – playoffs' winner
CB Villa de Aranda – playoffs'  finalist

Teams relegated to 2012–13 Primera Nacional
Pozoblanco
Mecalia Atl. Novás

Teams dissolved
Toledo

Teams

Final standings

Playoffs for promotion
Winner of Final will be promoted to Liga ASOBAL for 2012–13 season.
Host team: Frigoríficos del Morrazo
City: Cangas do Morrazo, Pontevedra
Venue: Pabellón Municipal O Gatañal
Date: 26–27 May 2012

Bracket

Semifinals

Third place

Final

Top goal scorers

External links
Regular season
Playoffs for promotion

División de Plata de Balonmano seasons
2011–12 in Spanish handball